
Year 104 BC was a year of the pre-Julian Roman calendar. At the time it was known as the Year of the Consulship of Marius and Fimbria (or, less frequently, year 650 Ab urbe condita) and the First Year of Taichu. The denomination 104 BC for this year has been used since the early medieval period, when the Anno Domini calendar era became the prevalent method in Europe for naming years.

Events 
 By place 

 Roman Republic 
Rome enacts a state of emergency, as the way to Italy lays open to the Germanic invaders. Gaius Marius, the conqueror of Jugurtha, is elected consul for the second time. He celebrates his triumph over Jugurtha, who is led in the procession and thrown into the Tullianum where he dies of starvation. 
 Second Servile War: Athenion starts a slave rebellion in Segesta (Sicily).

 Judea 
 Aristobulus I succeeds John Hyrcanus, becoming king and high priest of Judea, until 103 BC.

 Asia 
 War of the Heavenly Horses: Emperor Wu of Han sends an army of 6000 cavalrymen and 10,000 convicts under Li Guangli to attack Dayuan in modern Kyrgyzstan after Wugua, the king of Dayuan, refuses to send the Han any of the prized horses of Dayuan and, following a contentious meeting with the Han diplomats, has a vassal king kill the diplomats and seize their goods. The Han expeditionary force proceeds with difficulty, marching through arid regions and facing hostile cities.

Births 
 Julia, mother of Mark Antony
 Servilia, mistress of Julius Caesar

Deaths 
 Dong Zhongshu, Chinese scholar who promoted Confucianism at the central court of the Han Dynasty (b. 179 BC)
 Gnaeus Domitius Ahenobarbus, Roman consul and general
 John Hyrcanus, prince and high priest of Judea (b. 164 BC)
 Jugurtha, king of Numidia (execution by Rome) (b. c. 169 BC)

References